UNIFIED Music Group is an Australian-based music company. Founded by Jaddan Comerford in 2011, the company now has offices in Melbourne, Sydney, London and Los Angeles. UNIFIED Music Group runs record label UNFD, merchandise store 24Hundred, and music festivals UNIFY - A Heavy Music Festival and The Hills Are Alive. The artist management division also includes artists including Vance Joy, Violent Soho, The Amity Affliction and more.

As of March 2018, UNIFIED's labels (UNFD, ONETWO, NLV Records, Exist. Recordings, THAA Records and DOMESTIC LA LA) are distributed worldwide through Sony Music Australia.

Business divisions 
UNIFIED Music Group has four divisions that oversee various artists and music services.

Recorded music 
UNIFIED owns and operates five record labels: UNFD, ONETWO, Domestic La La, NLV Records and Exist. Recordings.

The label is home to artists such as Northlane, Hellions, Hands Like Houses, Tonight Alive and In Hearts Wake. As well as overseas artists Architects, Beartooth, Hacktivist and Crossfaith, amongst others.

ONETWO, launched in 2013, was formed as a collaboration between hip hop artist Illy and UNIFIED. ONETWO boasts an all-Australian roster of artists including Allday, Citizen Kay and Kuren.

NLV Records was founded by Australian artist Nina Las Vegas to become a go-to outlet for original and forward-thinking underground club music.

Exist. Recordings were founded in 2017 by Australian artists The Kite String Tangle and UNIFIED. Since its inception, Exist. Recordings have released music from its artists globally, including music from Lastlings, The Kite String Tangle and Golden Vessel.

UNIFIED has provided label services in Australia for American label Hopeless Records for 11 years. UNIFIED also provides label services for House Of Beige, the independent label owned and operated by UAM management client REMI, and 1825 Records, a collaboration with Atlantic Records and Matt Emsell.

UNIFIED Music Group also runs a publishing service with Mushroom Publishing that was formed in 2011. UNIFIED works to provide services for a number of artists including Vance Joy, Illy, Northlane and many more.

Artist management 
UNIFIED Music Group's Artist Management division is one of Australia's leading management companies. Its current roster includes Vance Joy, Violent Soho, The Amity Affliction, Northlane and many more artists.

Full artist roster:
 The Amity Affliction
 Bodyjar
 Edwin White
 Illy
 The Kite String Tangle
 Mike Waters
 Tash Sultana
 Trophy Eyes
 Vance Joy
 Violent Soho

The UNIFIED Grant
In 2016, the company launched The UNIFIED Grant. Announced by Founder and CEO Jaddan Comerford in his BIGSOUND Keynote speech, the UNIFIED Grant consists of five x $5,000 grants, available to passionate people to help them realize their dreams. The goal of The UNIFIED Grant is to foster the next generation of driven young creatives who want to work in music but don't play an instrument: photographers, producers, videographers, web developers, graphic designers, journalists, app builders, data analysts and all the other disciplines that haven't yet come into focus.

Merchandise services 
UNIFIED Music Group's Merchandise Services division runs merchandise companies, both independently and in collaboration with Australian labels and companies. UNIFIED founded merchandise store 24Hundred in 2013, overseeing its development into an Australian online music merchandise store. In recent years, the division has collaborated with other companies to create additional merchandise stores, including STL Tones, The Music Vault, The Vinyl Store and more.

Touring and events 
UNIFIED Music Group launched UNIFY - A Heavy Music Gathering in 2015. The festival, held in Tarwin Lower, Victoria, Australia, boasted a lineup in its first year of The Amity Affliction, Northlane. Also, Thy Art Is Murder, Deez Nuts and more. In subsequent years, the festival has grown in capacity and reputation, and the 2018 installment of the festival featuring Parkway Drive, Architects, and The Amity Affliction sold out in less than one week after the announcement.

In 2016, UNIFIED launched a full-time touring company in conjunction with Live Nation Australia, UNIFY Presents. Since its inception, this division has run large-scale Australian tours such as Bring Me the Horizon's 2016/2017 tour, Architects' 2017 tour, A Day To Remember's Bad Vibes Tour, Enter Shikari's Redshift Tour, Northlane and In Hearts Wake's Equinox Tour, and more.

In 2017, UNIFIED Music Group joined Live Nation and Secret Sounds to promote the first Australian installment of Download Festival, taking place in Melbourne in March 2018. The lineup includes Korn, Prophets of Rage, Limp Bizkit, Mastodon, NOFX, Good Charlotte & more.

References

Music companies of Australia
Australian companies established in 2011
Multinational companies headquartered in Australia
Companies based in Melbourne
Privately held companies of Australia
Record labels established in 2011